Football is the most popular sport in Kuwait.

Kuwait Football Association
The Kuwait Football Association is headquartered in Udailiya, Al-Ittihad Street, Kuwait City.

The Kuwait Football Association (KFA) was founded in 1952.

Tournaments

Domestic tournaments
 Kuwaiti Premier League
 Kuwaiti Division One
 Kuwait Emir Cup
 Kuwait Crown Prince Cup
 Kuwait Super Cup

Futsal
 Kuwaiti Futsal League
 Kuwait Futsal Federation Cup
 Kuwait Futsal Super Cup
 Mini World Futsal Club Tournament

Defunct
 Kuwait Federation Cup
 Kuwait Joint League
 Al-Khurafi Cup

Other tournaments held in Kuwait
 1964 Arab Nations Cup
 3rd Arabian Gulf Cup
 1975 AFC Youth Championship
 1980 AFC Asian Cup
 10th Arabian Gulf Cup
 2002 West Asian Games
 2002 Arab Nations Cup
 16th Arabian Gulf Cup
 2012 WAFF Championship
 23rd Arabian Gulf Cup

Kuwait football achievements
Asian Cup
 1 time champions of AFC Asian Cup (1980 AFC Asian Cup)
 1 time runners-up of AFC Asian Cup (1976 AFC Asian Cup)
 1 time third place of AFC Asian Cup (1984 AFC Asian Cup)

World Military Cup
 2 times champions of World Military Cup (Qatar 1981, Kuwait 1983)
 1 time runners-up of World Military Cup (Syria 1977)
 3 times third place of World Military Cup (Congo 1973, West Germany 1975, Kuwait 1979)

Football clubs in Kuwait
 Al Arabi
 Al Fahaheel
 Al Jahra
 Al Kuwait
 Al Naser
 Al Salmiya
 Al Shabab
 Al Qadsia
 Al Yarmouk
 Kazma
 Khaitan SC
 Sulaibikhat
 Sahel
 Tadamon
 Burgan SC

National football team

The Kuwait national team greatest achievement is winning the 1980 AFC Asian Cup Final. The Kuwait national team has qualified for the 1982 FIFA World Cup.

Women's football

Women's football is slowly growing in Kuwait.

Largest football stadiums in Kuwait

References

External links
Kuwait at the FIFA website.
Kuwait at the AFC website.
RSSSF (men)